Enneapogon nigricans, known by the common names blackheads, bottle washers, pappus grass, purpletop grass, and niggerheads, is a perennial Australian grass.

Distinctive lance-shaped seedheads appear in late spring and summer. They form at the top of wiry stalks over 30 cm long. They start as an olive green colour, but dry to a light brown. The seed itself is much like a parasol in appearance, and is around 5mm across. Germination is slow and unreliable and requires warm temperatures.

Leaves are smooth and of a bright, light green. Plants like sunny positions and generally grow in sunny, open mallee forests. Plants form tall dense tussocks to a maximum of only 20 cm across. They die down in late summer, before reshooting when the rains return.

References

Chloridoideae
Bunchgrasses of Australasia
Poales of Australia
Endemic flora of Australia
Plants described in 1810